The Little Juniata River, sometimes called the "Little J," is a  tributary of the Juniata River in the Susquehanna River watershed of Pennsylvania. It is formed at Altoona by the confluence of several short streams. It flows northeast in the Logan Valley at the foot of Brush Mountain.

At Tyrone, the river receives the southern Bald Eagle Creek, then turns abruptly southeast, passing through a water gap between the Brush and Bald Eagle Mountain ridges and enters Sinking Valley where it receives Sinking Run.

In colonial America, the river was used to float freight downriver on boats called "arcs". Shipments were placed on board in Birmingham, just east of Tyrone, to await water high enough to clear the rocky stream bed. Thus the Little Juniata was (and still is) listed as a commercially "navigable" river.

The Little Juniata River is a good spot for fly fishing; it holds a Class A population of wild brown trout and requires no stocking.

See also
List of rivers of Pennsylvania

References

External links
U.S. Geological Survey: PA stream gaging stations

Rivers of Pennsylvania
Tributaries of the Juniata River
Rivers of Blair County, Pennsylvania
Rivers of Huntingdon County, Pennsylvania